The Terre-de-Haut racer (Alsophis sanctonum) is a species of snake found in the Caribbean, on the Lesser Antilles. This species is endemic to Terre-de-Bas Island and Terre-de-Haut Island which make up the Îles des Saintes. Terre-de-Bas and Terre-de-Haut are very small islands with a total area of approximately 13 km2. Because of its presence only on this small area, it is a highly protected species.

It can reach nearly a meter in length. It feeds on lizards and small rodents. It rarely bites humans, but may release a foul-smelling (though harmless) cloacal secretion when disturbed.

Habitat
Alsophis sanctonum occurs along mangrove edges, roadsides, gardens, wooded areas, preferentially in semi-deciduous forest with Pimenta racemosa, Pisonia grandis, Guapinol, and Bursera simaruba. It is present in areas less frequented by humans.

Subspecies
A. sanctonum sanctonum Barbour, 1915 or Terre-de-Haut racer.
A. sanctonum danforthi Cochran, 1938 or Terre-de-Bas racer.

References

External links
 
 

Alsophis
Reptiles of the Caribbean
Reptiles of Îles des Saintes
Reptiles described in 1915
Taxa named by Thomas Barbour